Jennifer Nez Denetdale is a professor of American studies at the University of New Mexico, where she teaches courses in Native American Studies with an emphasis on race, class, and gender. She is the director of the University of New Mexico's Institute for American Research. She also specializes in Navajo history and culture and the effects of colonization and decolonization as it has impacted the Navajo people. She is the chair of the Navajo Nation Human Rights Commission. Denetdale is also an advocate for students who wish to pursue an education in Indigenous studies, Navajo women, and the LGBTQ+ community.

Early life 
Denetdale's parents had both attended Stewart Indian School, a boarding school in Carson City, Nevada. Denetdale was raised in Tohatchi, New Mexico from childhood with her three sisters and one brother. Her four clans are the Zia (or Weaver) Clan, and she was born for the Salt People Clan. Her maternal grandfathers are of the Red House clan and her paternal grandfathers are of the Water-Running-Together Clan.

Mentors 
Denetdale cites her former professor Luci Tapahonso and Louis Owens as her early mentors in her pursuit of higher education.

Education 
Denetdale earned her M.A. in English from Northern Arizona University (NAU). She later earned her doctorates in history from NAU in 1999. Denetdale is the first person of Diné / Navajo descent to earn a Ph.D.

Books, essays, and lectures

Indigenous Leadership and Gender in the 21st Century
The Long Walk: The Forced Navajo Exile
Nation to Nation: 09 Bad Acts / Bad Paper - Jennifer Nez Denetdale
Reclaiming Navajo History
Reclaiming Diné History The Legacies of Navajo Chief Manuelito and Juanita

Awards and recognition 

 Rainbow Naatsilid True Colors award
 UNM Faculty of Color Award 
 UNM Sarah Brown Belle award (2013)
 Excellence in Diné Studies (2015)
 UNM Presidential Award of Distinction (2017)

In 2015 Denetdale was chosen to deliver an inaugural address for the 23rd Navajo Nation Council.

References

Living people
Navajo people
Native American academics
Native American women academics
American women academics
Northern Arizona University alumni
University of New Mexico faculty
Year of birth missing (living people)
21st-century Native Americans
21st-century Native American women